Lugalannatum (lu-gal-an-na-tum) was a ruler ("patesi") of the city-state of Umma, circa 2130 BCE.

Lugalannatum is known from a deposit tablet, now in the Louvre Museum, in which he mentions the rule of Si'um, king of the Gutians. The tablet was first published in 1911, and first revealed the existence of a Gutian dynasty of Sumer. The tablet is written in the Akkadian language following the influence of the former Akkadian Empire, and uses Sumerian cuneiform characters for their phonetical value. It reads:

The name of the Temple, previously thought to be "Ê PA Temple", is now understood as being "Scepter Temple", and read E.GIDRU.

The text shows the allegiance of Lugalannatum, as simple Governor of Umma, towards the Gutian king of Sumer.

There is also an inscription by Lugalannatum, dedicated to the life of Urgigir.

References

Kings of Umma
22nd-century BC Sumerian kings